The Golden Palace is an American sitcom television series produced as a sequel to The Golden Girls, a continuation without Bea Arthur (though she did guest star in a double episode) that originally aired on CBS from September 18, 1992 to May 7, 1993. It starred Betty White, Rue McClanahan, Estelle Getty, Cheech Marin, and Don Cheadle. Billy L. Sullivan also co-starred for the first half of its run. Not as popular as its predecessor, the series aired for a single 24-episode season and was canceled by CBS.

Synopsis
The Golden Palace begins where The Golden Girls had ended, in the quartet's now-sold Miami house. With Dorothy Zbornak having married and left in the previous series finale, the three remaining housemates (Sophia Petrillo, Rose Nylund, and Blanche Devereaux) invest in The Golden Palace, a Miami hotel that is for sale. The hotel, however, is revealed to have been stripped of all of its personnel in an effort to appear more profitable, leaving only two employees: Roland Wilson, the hotel's manager; and Chuy Castillos, the hotel's chef. This requires the women to help perform the hotel duties.

The series focuses on the interactions between hotel staff and guests. Celebrity guest stars were frequent, and the series also featured the return of some recurring actors from The Golden Girls, such as Debra Engle as Rebecca Devereaux and Harold Gould as Miles Webber. Bea Arthur reprised her role as Dorothy Zbornak for a two-part storyline in which she visits the hotel to check on her mother.

Cast
 Betty White as Rose Nylund, a jack-of-all-trades in the hotel. In some episodes, this series has Rose being of a notably stronger will than her previous incarnation (as Dorothy Zbornak noted in her guest appearance, "When did she become the strong one?").
 Rue McClanahan as Blanche Devereaux, the main operator of the hotel. Her character traits, particularly her promiscuity and vanity, are somewhat toned down in this series, although she retains her Southern charm and generally chipper demeanor.
 Estelle Getty as Sophia Petrillo, the hotel's 87-year-old co-chef.
 Don Cheadle as Roland Wilson, the hotel's manager and a straight man to the rest of the cast. He is one of only two staff members retained from the previous ownership.
 Cheech Marin as Chuy Castillos, the other co-chef, and the other staff member held on from the previous ownership. He nearly quits after quarreling with Sophia over Italian vs. Mexican food, but comes back and remains with the staff for the rest of the series run.
 Billy L. Sullivan as Oliver Webb, Roland's foster child (episodes 1–6, 11, 14), a streetwise, arrogant preteen. Oliver appeared in eight episodes before being written out of the series, the character's birth mother retaking custody of him in episode 14.

Episodes

Production

Bea Arthur had grown tired of starring on The Golden Girls, and chose not to return for an eighth season. As a result, the show was revamped and retitled as a new series, The Golden Palace, with Betty White, Rue McClanahan, and Estelle Getty reprising their roles.

Like the original series, The Golden Palace was also created by Susan Harris, who once again served as executive producer alongside Paul Junger Witt and Tony Thomas. The trio had mixed feelings about the new series, but felt obligated to continue onward for the sake of the cast and crew. Thomas said, "We had been employing a lot of people, so to just pull the plug would have meant ending something that provided a very satisfying life for a lot of people". White said that she and her Golden Girls co-stars were initially skeptical of the new series but, "To our great surprise, we are having a ball. It's coming together much better than we had thought". McClanahan had suggested keeping the original series and adding a fourth roommate to replace Arthur's character, but this idea was rejected by the producers.

British comedian Alexei Sayle was originally hired to play the hotel's chef, who initially was to be portrayed as Eastern European. Sayle was replaced by Cheech Marin before the pilot was shot. The idea of having a Latino chef as a comic foil to the rest of the cast had originally been proposed at the beginning of The Golden Girls; the original chef, Coco (portrayed by Charles Levin), appeared in the first episode of The Golden Girls but was written out due to concerns about how to work him into later scripts with a cast of four women with strong personalities. With Arthur gone and the core group down to three, the concept was revived. Marin had wanted to branch out into television and away from being typecast as a Los Angeles stoner, and had previously worked on a film project with Witt. Marin was promised a spin-off series for his character in the event that The Golden Palace should be successful. The Golden Palace marked Marin's and Don Cheadle's first starring role in a television series.

The Carlyle hotel on Miami Beach's Ocean Drive was used for exterior shots depicting the Golden Palace hotel, while the rest of the series was taped at Ren-Mar Studios in Hollywood, California. On The Golden Girls, Getty often had to reshoot her scenes as she had trouble remembering her lines. McClanahan noted that this was not the case on The Golden Palace, speculating that Getty may have been subconsciously intimidated by Arthur.

Upon Betty White's death in 2021, Don Cheadle recounted the director of photography of Golden Palace having trouble with White and Cheadle in shared scenes due to their heavily contrasted complexions; White, Cheadle said, had hair and makeup change her look to reduce the contrast to ensure Cheadle was properly lit.

Cancellation and aftermath
Ratings were initially solid, with the show winning its timeslot for its first few weeks, but viewership fell steadily as the season progressed. A second season was to be greenlit according to McClanahan, although network executives changed their mind overnight and opted not to renew the series, canceling it in May 1993. Harris attributed the series' failure to Arthur's absence, saying it did not work without her.

Following the cancellation, White joined the short-lived second season of Bob, which had aired in the same block as The Golden Palace for its first season. Getty went on to portray Sophia in the later seasons of another Golden Girls spin-off, Empty Nest. The character returned to the rebuilt Shady Pines retirement home, which had burned down in the previous series. What became of the characters of Rose, Blanche, Roland, Chuy, and the hotel is left unresolved.

Notable episodes 
In 2020, amid the Black Lives Matter movement and following the murder of George Floyd, the episode "Camp Town Races Aren't Nearly as Much Fun as They Used to Be" attracted attention for how it had addressed the issues of racism and the Confederate flag. Journalist Seb Starcevic first drew attention to the episode in a Twitter thread that became popular before the wider media began to pick up the story.

Broadcast history
The Golden Palace aired on CBS, changing networks from NBC, which had aired The Golden Girls on Saturday nights for its entire run. NBC was willing to greenlight a 13-episode order for The Golden Palace, but the series producers were not satisfied with this number and moved the series to CBS, which promised a full season. NBC had been seeking a younger demographic, and The Golden Girls did not fit into its plans. White believed that a new network would be beneficial for the series.

CBS used The Golden Palace as one of four comedies assembled on Friday night in an effort to combat ABC's TGIF comedy block; The Golden Palace was grouped with Major Dad, Designing Women, and Bob, all of which were either successful comedies prior to the move, or in the case of Bob, featured a previously successful sitcom star (Bob Newhart).

Syndication of the series is handled by Disney–ABC Domestic Television. Although the series has never been syndicated as a stand-alone series, Lifetime, during the time it owned the rights to The Golden Girls, carried The Golden Palace on several occasions in the mid-2000s, running the series in rotation as a de facto eighth season of The Golden Girls. The show's existence is generally not well known. According to McClanahan, most Golden Girls fans were unaware of the series until reruns began airing on Lifetime.

In recognition of what would have been White's 100th birthday, The Golden Palace became available on the Hulu streaming platform January 10, 2022.

Reception
Writing for the Los Angeles Times, Rick Du Brow stated that Harris "deserves plenty of credit for infusing the premiere of the tired old series with new verve, drive and wit in its resuscitated form". John J. O'Connor of The New York Times wrote, "It's all a bit too familiar, and the format is forced into some unseemly stretching".

Several critics praised the series after it debuted on Hulu. Robert Lloyd, writing for the Los Angeles Times, applauded the cast "even if they are playing in a sequel to a show people remember better and love more". Eliot Glazer of Vulture.com considered the cast to have "undeniable" chemistry despite the absence of Arthur. Megan McCaffrey of Collider wrote that the series "takes the groundwork laid by the original and runs with it into a successful spinoff".

References

External links

 
 

The Golden Girls
1992 American television series debuts
1993 American television series endings
1990s American sitcoms
American sequel television series
CBS original programming
English-language television shows
Television shows set in Miami
Television series by ABC Studios
Television series about old age
Television series set in hotels